Alimero (Alimero.ru, styled alimero) is a Russian collaborative blog with elements similar to those found in social networks. The blog contains content related to cooking recipes and DIY tutorials. It was founded in 2011 by Alexey Kravets.

Awards 
 Runet Prize 2016  Online Community of the Year

References

External links 
 Alimero
 Alimero's Vkontakte page
 Alimero's Facebook profile
 В Москве вручили «Премию Рунета-2016»

Russian social networking websites
Internet properties established in 2011
Cooking websites